Fulaga (pronounced ) (proper name: Vulaga) is a crescent-shaped reef-limestone island in Fiji's Southern Lau Group.

The spectacular lagoon and the fact that the island is a Pritchardia thurstonii habitat contribute to its national significance as outlined in Fiji's Biodiversity Strategy and Action Plan.

Geography
Situated at 19.17° South and 178.65° West, it covers an area of 18.5 square kilometres.  It has a maximum elevation of 79 metres.  The limestone belongs to the Koroqara Limestone (Tokalau Limestone Group) and is probably Late Miocene in age.  In form it is a basin which has been breached in the north, flooding the interior, which has many islets and rocks. The island thus has this unique, beautiful lagoon  that adequately supplies the inhabitants with different varieties of fish and sea shells. There are three terrace levels, two with maximum elevations 55 m and 40 m, the third being lower.  There is an elevated notch 2 m above mean sea level.

Demographics
There are three villages, Muanaicake, Muanaira and Naividamu.  Total population was almost 600 in the middle 20th century but is now less than 400, due to migration to the mainland for secondary school education for children, and employment for parents.

In Tradition
The people are traditional carvers, skilled in the making of outrigger canoes and 'tanoa' (or 'kumete' in their dialect) which are wooden bowls carved out of local hardwood and used in formal and informal Yaqona Ceremonies and social gatherings across Fiji.

Footnotes

References
The Fiji Islands: A Geographical Handbook, By Ronald Albert Derrick,Published 1951, Govt. Print. Dept, Fiji.
Fiji by Casey Mahaney, Astrid Witte Mahaney, Published 2000 by Lonely Planet, 
New Zealand Journal of Geology and Geophysics; Published by The Royal Society of New Zealand
The Cyclopedia of Fiji: A Complete Historical and Commercial Review of Fiji, Published 1984, By R. McMillan, Original from the University of Michigan, Digitized 3 Apr 2007.

External links
 A Map of Fulaga

Islands of Fiji
Lau Islands
Preliminary Register of Sites of National Significance in Fiji